Osen is a municipality in Trøndelag county, Norway. It is part of the Fosen region. The administrative centre of the municipality is the village of Steinsdalen.

The  municipality is the 240th largest by area out of the 356 municipalities in Norway. Osen is the 340th most populous municipality in Norway with a population of 904.

General information

The municipality of Osen was established on 1 June 1892 when the old municipality of Bjørnør was split into three new municipalities: Osen (population: 1,575), Roan (population: 2,069), and Stoksund (population: 1,122). The municipal boundaries have not changed since. 

On 1 January 2018, the municipality switched from the old Sør-Trøndelag county to the new Trøndelag county.

Name
The municipality (originally the parish) is named after the old Osen farm since the first Osen Church was built there. The name, means "mouth of a river" (referring to the mouth of the Steinselva river).

Coat of arms
The coat of arms was granted on 27 March 1987. The official blazon is "Azure, a net argent". This means the arms have a blue field (background) and the charge is part of a fishing net. The fishing net has a tincture of argent which means it is commonly colored white, but if it is made out of metal, then silver is used. The design is based off of an old petroglyph and it was chosen to symbolize the importance of fishing for the community. Several different arms were designed, all with fisheries as the main theme, but the council finally chose this one, which is unique among Norwegian civic heraldry. The arms were designed by Einar H. Skjervold. The municipal flag has the same design as the coat of arms.

Churches
The Church of Norway has one parish within the municipality of Osen. It is part of the Fosen prosti (deanery) in the Diocese of Nidaros.

History
Osen was used as a satellite prison camp during the World War Two, mainly for Yugoslavian population.

Geography

The municipality of Osen is located to the north of Roan and the ocean lies to the west.

Most of the residents live in the Steinsdalen valley or along the coast. The northern part of the municipality has no direct road connection to the rest of the municipality, but is connected to the municipality of Flatanger to the north.

The Kya lighthouse is situated on a small island west in the Norwegian Sea, while Buholmråsa lighthouse lie on an island along the coast in the western part of the municipality.

Climate
The Norwegian Meteorological Institute has a weather station located near Buholmråsa lighthouse, with recording since 1965, showing a marine west coast climate/oceanic climate (Cfb). The all-time high temperature is  recorded July 2014; the all-time low is  recorded in February 1966. The four months June - September have never recorded overnight freezes. The average date for the first overnight freeze (below ) in autumn is November 7 (1981-2020 average). The driest month on record is January 1972 with 5.4 mm precipitation, and the wettest is September 1975 with 232.6 mm.

Government
All municipalities in Norway, including Osen, are responsible for primary education (through 10th grade), outpatient health services, senior citizen services, unemployment and other social services, zoning, economic development, and municipal roads. The municipality is governed by a municipal council of elected representatives, which in turn elect a mayor.  The municipality falls under the Trøndelag District Court and the Frostating Court of Appeal.

Municipal council
The municipal council of Osen is made up of 15 representatives that are elected to four year terms. The party breakdown of the council is as follows:

Mayors
The mayors of Osen:

1892–1893: Johan Moses Møller (H)
1894–1895: Sivert Kolstad (V)
1896–1901: Johan Moses Møller (H)
1902–1913: Sivert Kolstad (V)
1913–1914: Joakim Brusdal (V)
1914–1916: Johan Sundet (V)
1916-1916: Johan J. Vingsand  
1917–1922: Morten L. Osen  
1923–1934: Jakob Hopen (V)
1935–1941: Svein Osen (V)
1942–1945: Magnus Sundet 
1945–1947: Svein Osen (V)
1948–1955: Marius Sæther (Ap)
1956–1957: Fredrik Brattgjerd (Ap)
1958–1963: Lars Nesmo (Sp)
1964–1967: Morten Johannessen (Sp)
1968–1971: Harald Hanssen (V)
1972–1975: Ingar Nilssen (KrF)
1976–1979: Vidar Sætran (Ap)
1980–1983: Tormod Storvoll (Sp)
1984–1985: Einar Hepsø (Ap)
1985–1991: Asbjørn Teigen (Ap)
1992–1995: Bjarne Hestmo (Sp)
1995–2003: Einar Hepsø (Ap)
2003–2007: Julla Engan (Ap)
2007–2015: Jørn Nordmeland (V)
2015–present: John Einar Høvik (Ap)

Notable people 

 Augusta Aasen (1878 in Osen – 1920), a Norwegian politician, buried in the Kremlin Wall Necropolis (the only Norwegian woman buried there)
 Einar Hepsø (1926–2005), a Norwegian fishers' leader and politician, Mayor of Osen 1984-1985 and 1995-2003 
 Vivian Sørmeland (born 1985 in Osen), a contestant in Idol (Norway) in May 2006

See also
Prison camps in North Norway during World War Two, including at Osen

References

External links

Municipal fact sheet from Statistics Norway 

 
Municipalities of Trøndelag
1892 establishments in Norway